Colette Lorand (7 January 1923 – 26 April 2019) was a Swiss operatic soprano who made an international career. Known as a coloratura soprano, she created several roles in world premieres, including Sibylle in Carl Orff's De temporum fine comoedia in 1973 at the Salzburg Festival, and Regan in Aribert Reimann's Lear at the Nationaltheater München in 1978, also in the French premiere of this opera in Paris in 1982.

Career 
Born Colette Grauaug in Zurich, she grew up in a musical family. Her grandmother had been a celebrated singer in Hungary. Colette studied at the Musikhochschule Hannover, later privately with Melitta Hirzel in Zurich.

She made her operatic debut in 1945 at the Theater Basel as Marguerite in Gounod's Faust. She was a member of the ensemble of the Frankfurt Opera from 1951 to 1956. She appeared in coloratura soprano roles such as the Queen of the Night in Mozart's Die Zauberflöte in the first performance in the new building of the Hamburgische Staatsoper. She was a member of the house from 1955 to 1957 and from 1960 to 1969. In the 1963/64 season, she appeared as Frau Fluth in a new production of Otto Nicolai's Die lustigen Weiber von Windsor staged by Boleslaw Barlog. She also performed the role of Eva in Wagner's Die Meistersinger von Nürnberg, changing to more dramatic roles. She sang at the Vienna State Opera, as Violetta in Verdi's La Traviata and again as the Queen of the Night. In Lisbon, she appeared in 1961 at the Teatro Nacional de São Carlos as  Konstanze in Mozart's Die Entführung aus dem Serail.

Lorand performed in several world premieres, including in 1966 in Hamburg in Boris Blacher's Zwischenfälle bei einer Notladung, in 1972 in Berlin in Wolfgang Fortner's Elisabeth Tudor, and in 1973 at the Salzburg Festival in Carl Orff's De temporum fine comoedia. In July 1978, she appeared at the Nationaltheater München as Regan in Aribert Reimann's Lear. She performed the role also in the premiere in France in November 1982 at the Paris Opera in the translation by Antoinette Becker.

Lorand appeared in 20th-century operas by Frank Martin, Hans Werner Henze and Krzysztof Penderecki, among others. She performed the role of Lady Madeline in the reconstruction of Debussy's La Chute de la Maison Usher by Juan Allende-Blin, when it premiered at the Staatsoper Unter den Linden on 5 October 1979, conducted by Jesus Lopez-Cobos.

Her work was recorded by broadcasters and on records. She appeared in an opera film of Elektra by Richard Strauss, as the Overseer, alongside Leonie Rysanek in the title role. The film was directed in 1981 by Götz Friedrich and conducted by Karl Böhm.

In the 1981/82 season, she performed in Basel the role of Emilia Marty in Janáček's Die Sache Makropoulos. In this role, she retired from the stage in 1983.

Bibliography 
 Geerd Heinsen: Colette Lorand. Porträt anlässlich ihres 70. Geburtstags. In: Orpheus. February 1993, p 56.

References

External links 
 
 Lorand (née Grauaug), Colette Grove Music Online
 Königin der Nacht wider Willen Süddeutsche Zeitung
 
 Colette Lorand singing '"Der Hölle Rache kocht in meinem Herzen'" from "Die Zauberflöte" on YouTube
 

Swiss sopranos
1923 births
2019 deaths
Musicians from Zürich
Swiss expatriates in Germany